The 2006 Clemson Tigers football team represented Clemson University in the 2006 NCAA Division I FBS football season The team was coached by Tommy Bowden and played their homes game in the Memorial Stadium.

Portions of the season, specifically the games against Florida Atlantic and Florida State, were featured in the 2020 film Safety, which is about sophomore safety Ray McElrathbey taking care of his little brother while their mother receives treatment for drug addiction.

Notable
ESPN's College Gameday show made its first-ever appearance in Clemson for the game between the Tigers and the Georgia Tech Yellow Jackets on October 21.  Kirk Herbstreit mentioned both during and after the show, that he felt that Clemson hosted one of the best Gameday audiences he'd ever seen.  The Gameday audience at Clemson also set a new noise record when measured in the latter half of the show.

Season
Entering the season, the Tigers had high expectations, hoping to compete for a spot in the ACC Championship Game. After a defeat at Boston College in the second game of the season, Clemson achieved off six straight victories, during which they averaged nearly 42 points a game. But things soon fell apart, with Clemson losing four out of their last five, including a loss to Kentucky in the Music City Bowl, and a 31–28 loss to arch rival South Carolina.  The team finished the season with a disappointing 8–5 record.

Schedule

Rankings

Coaching staff

Tommy Bowden – Head Coach
Rob Spence – Offensive Coordinator/Quarterbacks
Vic Koenning – Defensive Coordinator/Defensive Backs
Brad Scott – Assistant Head Coach/Offensive Line  
David Blackwell – Recruiting Coordinator/Linebackers 
Burton Burns – Running Backs 
Billy Napier – Tight Ends 
Chris Rumph – Defensive Line 
Dabo Swinney – Wide Receivers 
Ron West – Outside Linebackers 
Mike Dooley – Defensive Video Graduate Assistant 
Andy Ford – Defensive Graduate Assistant 
Paul Hogan – Offensive Graduate Assistant 
Willie Simmons – Offensive Video Graduate Assistant

Game summaries

Florida Atlantic

    
    
    
    
    
    
    
    
    
    
    

Part of that game would be recreated at halftime of the Clemson game between UNC Charlotte on September 21, 2019 as part of a Disney movie.

Florida State

    
    
    
    
    
    
    
    

Clemson's first win in Tallahassee since 1989.

References

Clemson
Clemson Tigers football seasons
Clemson Tigers football